Rachna Singh (born 1972) is a Canadian politician and trade unionist who has represented the electoral district of Surrey-Green Timbers in the Legislative Assembly of British Columbia since 2017. A member of the British Columbia New Democratic Party (BC NDP) caucus, she  has served as Minister of Education and Child Care of British Columbia since December 2022.

Biography
Singh was born in Delhi, and grew up in Chandigarh. She attended Panjab University, from which she received a master's degree in psychology. She moved to Canada in 2001, settling in Surrey, British Columbia. Prior to her election to the legislature, Singh worked as a drug and alcohol counsellor. She became active in her labour union local, and eventually became a National Representative (staff) for the Canadian Union of Public Employees representing workers through advocacy in grievance handling, labour arbitrations, organizing, community and political activism and helping advise local unions on matters of internal administration.

With incumbent Member of the Legislative Assembly (MLA) for Surrey-Green Timbers Sue Hammell declining to seek re-election in 2017, Singh decided to contest the BC NDP nomination for the riding. She was acclaimed as the NDP's candidate, then went on to defeat Liberal candidate and former Surrey-Green Timbers MLA Brenda Locke at the general election. 

After winning re-election in 2020, Singh was appointed Parliamentary Secretary for Anti-Racism Initiatives by Premier John Horgan. On December 7, 2022 she was named Minister of Education and Child Care by Premier David Eby.

Singh is married to Gurpreet Singh, a journalist for the Georgia Straight and publisher of the Radical Desi magazine; they have two children together. Both descend from families with a history of activism for various social and economic causes in their native India. She is a secular Sikh.

Electoral history

References

External links

Legislative Assembly of British Columbia - MLA: Hon. Rachna Singh

1972 births
Living people
British Columbia New Democratic Party MLAs
Education ministers of British Columbia
People from Surrey, British Columbia
Women MLAs in British Columbia
Canadian trade unionists
21st-century Canadian politicians
21st-century Canadian women politicians
Canadian politicians of Indian descent
Indian emigrants to Canada
Panjab University alumni